Eugen Herrigel (20 March 1884 – 18 April 1955) was a German philosopher who taught philosophy at Tohoku Imperial University in Sendai, Japan, from 1924 to 1929 and introduced Zen to large parts of Europe through his writings.

While living in Japan from  1924 to 1929, he studied kyūdō, traditional Japanese archery, under Awa Kenzō (阿波研造:1880-1939), a master of archery and founder of his own new religious movement called "The Great Doctrine of the Way of Shooting." Herrigel pursued archery in the hope of better understanding Zen. Although Herrigel claims to have studied archery for six years, he was only in Japan for just over five years and probably only studied archery for three of those years. In July 1929 he returned to Germany and was given a chair in philosophy at the University of Erlangen. In a letter to Encounter Magazine Gershom Scholem writes that "Herrigel joined the Nazi Party after the outbreak of the war and some of his former friends in Frankfurt, who broke with him over this issue, told me about his career as a convinced Nazi, when I enquired about him in 1946. He was known to have stuck it out to the bitter end. This was not mentioned in some biographical notes on Herrigel published by his widow, who built up his image as one concerned with the higher spiritual sphere only." He also states in the same letter that he thinks this fact supports the point made by Arthur Koestler in the same magazine that Zen can be used to justify the politics of the Nazi party.

Eugen Herrigel was an active member of the Nazi organization Militant League for German Culture.

Writings
In 1936 he published a 20-page article describing his experiences entitled "Die Ritterliche Kunst des Bogenschiessens" (The Knightly Art of Archery) in the journal, Zeitschrift für Japanologie. This later formed the core of his most famous work  Zen in the Art of Archery, which is perhaps one of the most influential works ever written on Zen in a European language.

Herrigel died in 1955. Among his papers were found voluminous notes on various aspects of Zen. These notes were selected and edited by Hermann Tausend in collaboration with Gusty L. Herrigel, the author's wife (who studied Japanese flower arranging) and were published in German under the title Der Zen-Weg. This version was revised and edited by Alan Watts in 1960 and published by Vintage Press as The Method of Zen.

Dispute
Yamada Shōji has demonstrated that Herrigel's teacher, Awa Kenzō, never practiced Zen or even studied under a Zen master. While John Stevens has reproduced a photograph of a calligraphy by Awa that reads "The Bow and Zen are One.", Yamada quotes Awa's biographer Sakurai Yasunosuke, who wrote "While Kenzō used the phrase 'the bow and Zen are one' and used philosophical language of Mahāyāna Buddhism in particular to describe shadō, he did not approve of Zen unconditionally." Rather, Kenzō was focused on establishing his own religion of archery and claimed he was doing missionary work in promoting it. Herrigel either intentionally or inadvertently misinterpreted Awa's teachings as an expression of Zen.

Herrigel himself never really learned the Japanese language and instead relied on interpreters, who have since confessed that they seldom understood Awa's cryptic phrases. Much of Herrigel's understanding of Zen appears to have derived from the writings of D.T. Suzuki, the great lay popularizer of Zen Buddhism in the west. Suzuki himself seems to have initially agreed with Herrigel's analysis, having written the introduction to the post-war edition of Zen in the Art of Archery, but he later wrote that "Herrigel is trying to get to Zen, but he hasn't grasped Zen itself".

Volker Zotz revealed in his book, Auf den glückseligen Inseln, on Buddhism and German Culture, that Eugen Herrigel was a strong supporter of the Nazi party. For his involvement in Nazism he was forbidden to teach at the University for three years after 1945.

References

1885 births
1955 deaths
Zen Buddhism writers
Militant League for German Culture members